Shunan English School SES, a privately-owned company with a staff of both native English speakers (9) and English-speaking Japanese teachers (15+), has been providing instruction in English and other foreign languages since 1972.  Currently, SES maintains offices in three cities in Yamaguchi Prefecture, with its main office located in Shunan. In addition to classes taught at its offices, SES offers courses in high schools, colleges, corporate offices, community centers, and private homes. SES also provides translation services.

Our City is located on the southern coast of Yamaguchi Prefecture. It has a population of approximately 150,000 people. Located in western Japan, Yamaguchi has many historic sites and beautiful natural locations, including islands, beaches, mountains and parks.  Shunan enjoys a mild climate year-round and is relatively safe from earthquakes and typhoons due to its protected location in the Seto Inland Sea.

External links
 SES official website

Schools in Japan